The Bureaucrats (French: Messieurs les ronds de cuir) is a 1936 French comedy film directed by Yves Mirande and starring Lucien Baroux, Pierre Larquey and Gabriel Signoret. It was remade as 1959 film of the same title.

Plot 
The film, which is a satire of government bureaucracy, is about public servants who spend so much time sitting in their office chairs that they need to order special cushions for their buttocks. The premise is referenced in the original French title Messieurs les ronds de cuir, which translates into Men with the leather circles, alludes to.

Cast 
 Lucien Baroux as Lahrier  
 Pierre Larquey as Le conservateur  
 Gabriel Signoret as M. Soupe  
 Saturnin Fabre as Le tondu  
 Roger Duchesne as Chavarax  
 Jean Tissier as Nègre  
 Josette Day as Mme Chavarax  
 Arletty as La belle-soeur de la hourmerie  
 Armand Lurville as La Hourmerie 
 Georges Bever as Ovide  
 André Numès Fils as Sainthomme  
 Betty Spell as Mlle de Rocroy  
 Jeanne Véniat as Mme La Hourmerie  
 Paul Faivre as Van der Hogen  
 Emile Saulieu as Le concierge  
 Léonce Corne as Le chef du service des expéditions  
 Simone Chobillon

Production 
The film's sets were designed by the art director René Renoux.

References

Bibliography 
 Andrews, Dudley. Mists of Regret: Culture and Sensibility in Classic French Film. Princeton University Press, 1995.

External links 
 

1936 films
French comedy films
1936 comedy films
1930s French-language films
Films directed by Yves Mirande
French black-and-white films
Films about bureaucracy
1930s French films